Tokyo Inter-High School is a primarily online international high school based in Tokyo, Japan. It was founded in 2000. Students who enroll in Tokyo Inter-High School are able to earn an American high school degree from anywhere in the world as long as they have access to a stable internet connection. Traditionally, in-person classes are offered for students who live in Tokyo on their campus located in Shibuya. The American degree is offered through Alger Learning Center & Independence High School located in Sedro-Wooley, Washington. In addition to an American diploma, students can also apply to receive a Japanese diploma.

The school primarily caters to two types of students, students who wish to pursue special activities during their high school years that would be impossible at a traditional school, such as a student who wishes to pursue a career in ballet and must relocate to a foreign country, and students who wish to pursue a collegiate career in a foreign country. Students are able to create their own curriculum, allowing them to effectively use their time spent training their skills as school credits towards their graduation.

References

External links
 http://www.inter-highschool.ne.jp/foreign/

High schools in Tokyo
Educational institutions established in 2000
Distance education institutions based in Japan
2000 establishments in Japan